The basketball competition at the 2009 Jeux de la Francophonie was held between 28 September and 5 October. The events took place at the courts of Sporting Al Riyadi Beirut, in Lebanon. Romania won the competition overall, beating runners up Senegal in the final. Both a men's and a women's tournament was announced in the programme but a schedule conflict with the EuroBasket 2009 tournament meant that only the women's competition was held.

Cyprus, originally the leaders of Group A, were disqualified from the competition. It was discovered that some of the country's team members were not fully naturalised citizens, including one American, one Polish, one Serbian and two Croat players. The organizers proposed, in keeping with the spirit of the Games, to maintain the scheduled match against France but its result was not taken into account.

Women's competition

Group stage

Finals

References

External links
Official results

Sport in Lebanon
2009 Jeux de la Francophonie
Basketball at the Jeux de la Francophonie